GNOME Builder is a general purpose integrated development environment (IDE) for the GNOME platform, primarily designed to aid in writing GNOME-based applications. It was initially released on March 24, 2015. The application's tagline is "A toolsmith for GNOME-based applications".

Features
 GNOME Builder has been addressing "GNOME App" developers from its inception, and aims to integrate well with other Gnome desktop development tools.
 Integrated support for GNOME Devhelp.
 The version control system git can be used to highlight code additions and changes.
 Support for developing flatpak applications.
 Syntax highlighting for many programming languages by using GtkSourceView.
 Code completion is available for the C-languages (C, C++, etc.), Python and Rust, with additional languages under development.
 Plugins that can be written in C, Python 3, or Vala.
 Basic support for many programming languages, and will offer additional features for languages that are supported by GObject Introspection.

More features will be integrated once GTK Scene Graph Kit will have been merged into GTK. sysprof was forked and its version number bumped from 1.2.0 to 3.20 and was integrated in version 3.22.

GNOME Builder uses GNOME Code Assistance to provide code diagnostics for CSS, HTML, JS, JSON, Python, Ruby, SCSS, shell script and XML. Jedi is used for code completion for Python. Clang is used for code assistance for the C-like languages. Rust diagnostics are provided by using the Language Server Protocol to communicate with the Rust Language Server.

User interface
Most of the interface is dedicated to the centrally positioned code editor. The editor automatically recognizes most programming languages and will highlight the text accordingly. When a version control system is used, colored bars next to the line numbers indicate changes to those lines. For supported languages, additional symbols highlight lines that contain errors or poorly formatted code.

Builder can switch between Builder's own, Vim-like and Emacs-like keyboard bindings.

Around the code-editor, additional panels can be toggled into view. These include a project-tree, a terminal-window, and a help-browser. The project tree allows the user to perform file and folder operations.

Development
The development of GNOME Builder was crowdfunded in January 2015 on the Indiegogo platform. The campaign reached 187% ($56,245) of its $30,000 funding goal.

Version history

See also
 Glade Interface Designer
 Anjuta
 GNOME Devhelp

References

External links
 
 gnome-builder on GNOME's GitLab instance
 
 FOSDEM2013: Has the GNOME community gone crazy? - Video

GNOME Applications
Integrated development environments
Software that uses Meson